"Feels Like Home" (stylized in all caps) is a song by American singer Bea Miller and Canadian singer Jessie Reyez. It was released as a single on August 23, 2019. The song was later included on the compilation EP, Lust, on September 25, 2020.

Background
The song was first announced by Miller on her Twitter account on August 20, 2019. A video of Miller singing part of the song was released on the same date. The next day, fans could unlock a preview of the song if they tweeted the hashtag "#feelslikehome".

Music video
On August 22, 2019, Miller announced that the music video would drop on the same date as the song.

Release history

References

2019 songs
2019 singles
Bea Miller songs
Hollywood Records singles
Jessie Reyez songs
Songs written by Jessie Reyez